Michel-Charles Le Cène (ca. 1684 Honfleur, France ‐ 29 April 1743  in Amsterdam) was a French printer. His house printed the first editions of works by Vivaldi, Geminiani, Handel, Quantz, Tartini, Telemann and Locatelli, among others. The workshop was in Amsterdam.

1684 births
1743 deaths
French printers
People from Honfleur
French music publishers (people)
Huguenots